Nam Phrae may refer to several places in Thailand:

Nam Phrae, Hang Dong
Nam Phrae, Phrao